Ellen Birgitte Pedersen (born 1955) is a Norwegian politician for the Socialist Left Party.

Born in Bergen, she took the cand.med. degree in 1979. She has worked in Øksnes, Bodø (University Hospital of Nordland) and Stokmarknes, as well as a lecturer at the University of Tromsø. She has been a member of Øksnes municipal council and Nordland county council, and chaired her party on both municipal and county level. She has also chaired the former health trust Hålogaland Hospitalbeen a board member of Nordland Hospital Trust.

She joined the Socialist Left Party in 1972, and has chaired the local branch in Øksnes and county branch in Nordland. From June 2008 to October 2009 she served as a State Secretary in the Ministry of Health and Care Services, as a part of Stoltenberg's Second Cabinet.

References

1955 births
Living people
20th-century Norwegian physicians
Norwegian women physicians
Socialist Left Party (Norway) politicians
Nordland politicians
Norwegian state secretaries
Norwegian women state secretaries
21st-century Norwegian physicians